Komo or KOMO may refer to:

Places 
Komo or Kommos (Crete), an ancient seaport
Komo (department), a department of Estuaire Province in western Gabon
Komo, Myanmar, a village in north-eastern Myanmar
Komo (Fiji), an island of the Lau Archipelago of Fiji
Komo, Guinea-Bissau, a sector in Tombali Region
Komo Rural LLG, Papua New Guinea

Radio and TV stations 
KOMO-TV, television station in Seattle, Washington
KNWN (AM), all-news radio station in Seattle, Washington, known as KOMO from 1926 to 2022
KNWN-FM, a radio station (97.7 FM) licensed to Oakville, Washington, known as KOMO-FM from 2009 to 2022

Other uses 
Komo people, an ethnic group who live along the Sudanese-Ethiopian border
Komo language, a Nilo-Saharan language

See also
Como (disambiguation)